Lawrence "Teddy Boy" Houle (1938-2020) was Métis fiddler from Ebb and Flow, Manitoba. He started to play at an early age, reportedly teaching himself to play "Red River Valley" on one string. Houle went on to become an influential fiddler and vocalist, recording a number of albums and maintaining an active performance schedule.

Houle was of Anishinaabe ancestry and had a challenging childhood. His father was absent from his life and his step-father did not value his musical talents.

As a part of the folk revival movement of the 1960s, Houle performed at festivals such as the Mariposa Folk Festival He has also appeared as a fiddler in several films, including "Spirit rider" and "Medicine Fiddler."

In keeping with Métis fiddling style Houle often jigs while playing. His musical style follows in the Métis and indigenous traditions and he has been devoted to a recovery of his Anishinabe heritage in the last twenty years. He has taken on deliberate projects aimed at recovery and renewal of the Ojibway language, including releasing several recordings of Ojibway music. He was an Elder and cultural resource person at Métis Calgary Family Service Society where he facilitated a variety of workshops.

Discography
Old Native And Métis Fiddling in Manitoba, Vols 1 & 2, Falcon FP - 187 and 287 - 1987
Houle, L. T. B., Houle, L. T. B., & Manitoba Association for Native Languages. (n.d.). Anishinaabe Christmas. Winnipeg, MB: Sunshine Sound Studios.
Benitez, J. E., Lorenzano, A., Silva, M., Silva, M., Nayap, P., Xal, M. M., Coc, C., ... Lee Cremo Trio,. (1997). Wood that sings : Indian Fiddle Music of the Americas.

References

See also
Lederman, Anne. "Native and Métis Fiddling: Portrait of a People," Fiddler Magazine Vol. 8, Winter 2001

Canadian folk fiddlers
Métis musicians
21st-century Canadian violinists and fiddlers
1938 births
2020 deaths
Canadian Métis people
Canadian male violinists and fiddlers